Karymsky (masculine), Karymskaya (feminine), or Karymskoye (neuter) may refer to:
Karymsky (volcano), a volcano on the Kamchatka Peninsula, Russia
Karymsky Lake, a lake on the Kamchatka Peninsula, Russia
Karymsky District, a district of Zabaykalsky Krai, Russia
Karymskoye, an urban-type settlement in Karymsky District of Zabaykalsky Krai, Russia
Karymskaya, a rural locality (a village) in Krasnoyarsk Krai, Russia